The Fix Is In may refer to:
"The Fix is In", a song by Heatmiser from their 1996 album Mic City Sons
"The Fix Is In", a song by OK Go from their 2002 album OK Go
"The Fix", a song by Elbow from their 2009 album The Seldom Seen Kid

See also
 The Fix (disambiguation)
 Fix (disambiguation)
 Match fixing